The qualification for football tournament at the 1992 Summer Olympics, all players should be under 23 years old.

Qualified teams
The final tournament had 16 spots.
 Europe: 4.5 places, contested by 33 teams.
 South America: 2 places, contested by 10 teams.
 North and Central America: 2 places, contested by 25 teams.
 Africa: 3 places, contested by 24 teams. 
 Asia: 3 places, contested by 28 teams.
 Oceania: 0.5 places, contested by 4 teams.

The following 16 teams qualified for the 1992 Olympic men's football tournament:

Qualifications

Europe

South America

North and Central America

Africa

Asia

Oceania

First six matches played in Australia, other six matches played in Fiji. 

Australia advanced to the International Play-off.

OFC–UEFA play-off

References

External links
 RSSSF

Football at the 1992 Summer Olympics
1992